Gleichen is a municipality (in this case, a Gemeinde) in the district of Göttingen, in Lower Saxony, Germany. Named after the two castles, Neuen-Gleichen and Alten-Gleichen on the twin peaks in the Gemeinde, it is situated about 10 km southeast of Göttingen, from which the peaks are visible. Its seat is Reinhausen.

Location 

The municipality of Gleichen is located southeast of Göttingen, west-southwest of Duderstadt and north-northwest of Heilbad Heiligenstadt. The River Garte flows through several of the villages in the municipality, as does the small Wendebach stream, which is impounded by the Wendebach Reservoir. Both streams are right, eastern tributaries of the Leine.

In the center of the municipality are Die Gleichen, a pair of hills 430 m high, that rise between Appenrode, Bettenrode and Gelliehausen. Both hills were once crowned by castles, whose ruins may still be seen.

The villages in the municipality may be accessed on state roads (Landesstraßen) branching eastwards off the B 27 federal road.

Subdivisions 

Besides Reinhausen, the villages in the municipality are: 
 Beienrode
 Benniehausen
 Bischhausen
 Bremke
 Diemarden
 Etzenborn
 Gelliehausen
 Gross Lengden
 Ischenrode
 Kerstlingerode
 Klein Lengden
 Rittmarshausen
 Sattenhausen
 Weißenborn
 Wöllmarshausen

Political situation 

Currently, the community council of twenty-five (including the mayor) has eleven SPD, six CDU, five Greens, two BsP, and one SWG members.

Cultural resources and attractions 

The Akademie Waldschloesschen lies on the L568 between Reinhausen and Bremke. In Bremke itself, there is the Waldbühne, an outdoor stage where, since 1949, fairy tales have been presented in the form of plays.

Personalities 

Gottfried August Bürger(1747-1794), the poet lived from 1772 to 1773 in Gelliehausen and 1774 to 1784 in Wöllmarshausen and worked from 1772 to 1784 as court elderly in the Amtshaus in Gelliehausen
 Werner Schröder (1916-2010), jurist, judge at the Bundessozialgericht in Kassel
 Klaus-Peter Bruns (1913-2011) German farmer and politician (SPD).

References

External links
 Official government site 

Göttingen (district)